Tyson Pearce (born August 12, 2007) is an American soccer player who currently plays for MLS Next Pro side St. Louis City SC 2.

Career

Early

St. Louis City 2
On March 10, 2023, Pearce was announced as part of the second St. Louis City SC 2 roster in MLS Next Pro.

Career statistics

References

Soccer in the United States
Association football players
Living people